The Public Radio Exchange (PRX) is a non-profit web-based platform for digital distribution, review, and licensing of radio programs. The organization is the largest on-demand catalogue of public radio programs available for broadcast and internet use.

History

The PRX site and its services launched in September 2003 after a two-year planning, research, and development phase supported by the Corporation for Public Broadcasting, the National Endowment for the Arts, and the Ford Foundation. PRX received additional support from the NTIA Technology Opportunities Program, the MacArthur Foundation, the Open Society Institute, the Surdna Foundation, and Google Grants. PRX offices are located in Cambridge, Massachusetts.

On February 28, 2007, PRX and the Corporation for Public Broadcasting announced the Public Radio Talent Quest. It was an open search for new public radio talent, and gave producers the chance to produce a pilot show for public radio. Finalists were to be chosen after a five-round competition voted on by fans, public radio professionals and celebrity judges. On May 14, the first round of submissions ended with 1,452 entries. As of May 22, 2007, the Public Radio Talent Quest site had over 14,600 registered users.

On April 9, 2008, The MacArthur Foundation selected PRX as one of its 2008 recipients of the MacArthur Award for Creative and Effective Institutions. In late November of that year, PRX soft-launched PRX 3.0. The launch included their Remix Radio project which provides a sampling of the content available for licensing on the site.

On January 1, 2009, PRX, Inc became a Massachusetts 501c3 non-profit corporation. Previously PRX had been a project area of the Station Resource Group, a Maryland non-profit. On January 28, PRX Remix was added to XM Satellite Radio on channel 136. Later that year, on July 19, PRX launched the Public Radio Player 2.0, an iPhone app for public radio developed by PRX, NPR, and other public radio partners, and funded by the Corporation for Public Broadcasting. On August 11, PRX was included in CPB's agreement with SoundExchange through 2015 as a covered public radio entity for music webcasting royalties.

In 2010 PRX launched two iPhone apps: the This American Life app on February 1 and the WBUR Boston app on July 7. That same year, PRX won a Peabody Award for The Moth Radio Hour. PRX was also announced as a winner of the 2010 Knight News Challenge for Story Exchange, a crowdfunding journalism project, on June 16. On September 8, 2010, PRX announced $2.7M in new funding from the Corporation for Public Broadcasting, the MacArthur Foundation, and the Ford Foundation.

On December 8, 2011, PRX announced $2.5M in funding from Knight Foundation to create the Public Media Accelerator. In May 2014, PRX received a Peabody Award for the Reveal show "The VA's Opiate Overload".

On August 15, 2018, PRX and Public Radio International announced they would merge, though both networks would maintain separate identities and programming. The PRI brand was retired the following year.

PRX Remix
Formerly known as Public Radio Remix. As of 2011, two radio stations, KPBZ in Spokane, Washington and WREM in Canton, New York, air a full-time schedule of programming from PRX, branded as Public Radio Remix. Both stations are owned by the same organizations as their markets' primary National Public Radio affiliates. PRX Remix also airs on Sirius XM Channel 123.

Several other public radio stations air some, but not all, Public Radio Exchange programming in their schedules.

Numbers
On May 22, 2007, PRX had 12,167 available radio pieces, 28,149 members, including 445 radio stations, and 2,782 individual producers.

Programs distributed by PRX
Regular series distributed by PRX include:

 12th Street Jump
 99% Invisible
 American Parlor Songbook
 American Routes
 Afropop Worldwide
 As It Happens
 Bioneers
 Big Picture Science
 Classical 24
 Day 6
 Echoes
 Exploring Music
 Folk Alley
 Global Village
 Hearts of Space
 HowSound
 Inside Europe from Deutsche Welle
Israel Story
 Jazz After Hours
 Jazz with David Basse
 Ken Rudin's Political Junkie
 L.A. Theatre Works
 Latino USA
 Live Wire Radio
 Living on Earth
 Meditative Story
 Milk Street Radio
 The Moth Radio Hour
 New Letters on the Air
 On Being
 On Story
 Open Source
 Ozark Highlands Radio
 Philosophy Talk
 Pittsburgh Symphony Orchestra
 Planetary Radio
 Podcast Playlist
 Q
 The Record Shelf
 Reveal Weekly
 Says You!
 The Score with Edmund Stone
 Sea Change Radio
 Selected Shorts
 Skeptoid
 Sound Opinions
 This American Life (self-distributed, but uses PRX to deliver shows to stations)
 The Tobolowsky Files
 The World
 To the Best of Our Knowledge
 A Way with Words
 Zorba Paster on Your Health

References

External links

PRX animated 4-minute overview
PRX's YouthCast podcast
Public Radio Talent Quest
Remix Radio
Public Radio Player

Public radio in the United States
XM Satellite Radio channels
Sirius Satellite Radio channels
American radio networks
American entertainment websites
2003 establishments in Massachusetts
Podcasting companies
Organizations established in 2003
Organizations based in Cambridge, Massachusetts
501(c)(3) organizations
Sirius XM Radio channels